Gaius Cassius Longinus was a Roman consul in 73 BC (together with Marcus Terentius Varro Lucullus). 

Cassius and his colleague passed the lex Terentia Cassia that ordered the state to buy up grain in Sicily and sell it for a low price in Rome. As proconsul of Cisalpine Gaul in the next year, 72 BC, during the Third Servile War, Cassius tried to stop Spartacus and his followers near Mutina (Modena) as the slave army was trying to break through to unoccupied Gaul, but suffered defeat and barely managed to get away alive. Two years later, Cassius appeared as a witness for the prosecution, which was being led by Cicero, in the trial against the corrupt former governor of Sicily, Verres. In 66 BC, Cassius supported the Manilian law that gave command of the war against Mithridates to Pompey; he was joined in this by Cicero, then praetor, whose famous speech in support of the same bill survives.

This Cassius Longinus may have been the father of the more famous assassin of Caesar, Gaius Cassius Longinus.

Notes

Bibliography
Broughton, T. Robert S. Magistrates of the Roman Republic, vol. 2. Cleveland: Case Western University Press, 1968, p. 109 and 117.
Bradley, Keith. Slavery and Rebellion in the Roman World. Bloomington: Indiana University Press, 1989, p. 96.

Selected ancient Sources
Livy, Periochae 96.
Plutarch, Crassus 9.7.
Florus, Epitome 2.8.10.
Orosius 5.24.4.
Appian, Civil Wars 1.117.

1st-century BC Roman consuls
Longinus, Gaius (consul 681 AUC)
Year of birth unknown
Place of birth missing
Year of death unknown
Place of death missing